Léon-Benoît-Charles Thomas (1826–1894) was a French cardinal. He served as Bishop of La Rochelle (1867–1883) and Archbishop of Rouen (1883–1894).

References

1826 births
1894 deaths
19th-century French cardinals
Cardinals created by Pope Leo XIII